Prorella irremorata is a moth in the family Geometridae first described by Harrison Gray Dyar Jr. in 1923. It is found in the United States in the desert regions of southern California, Nevada and Arizona.

The wingspan is about 15 mm. The wings are light ocherous with darker blotches along the costa and in the outer area opposite the cell and above the tornus. The most prominent blotch occurs in the central area of the costa. Between this blotch and the apex of the wing are two other smaller blotches. Adults have been recorded on wing from March to May and in September.

References

Moths described in 1923
Eupitheciini